Urophora stalker is a species of tephritid or fruit flies in the genus Urophora of the family Tephritidae.

Distribution
Kazakhstan, Turkmenistan, Uzbekistan, Tajikistan.

References

Urophora
Insects described in 1984
Diptera of Asia